Fukuititan (meaning "Fukui giant") is a genus of titanosauriform sauropod dinosaur that lived in the Early Cretaceous (either Barremian or Aptian age) in what is now Japan. It is known from FPDM-V8468, the associated partial skeleton of a single individual, recovered from the Kitadani Dinosaur Quarry (Kitadani Formation) of the Tetori Group, at Katsuyama City. The type species, Fukuititan nipponensis, was described in 2010 by Japanese scientists Yoichi Azuma and Masateru Shibata of the Fukui Prefectural Dinosaur Museum. The discovery sheds light on Japanese titanosauriforms, which are poorly known in the region.

References

Early Cretaceous dinosaurs of Asia
Fossil taxa described in 2010
Macronarians
Fossils of Japan